The NXT North American Championship is a professional wrestling championship created and promoted by the American promotion WWE, defended on their NXT brand division. It is one of three secondary championships in WWE, along with the United States Championship on Raw and the Intercontinental Championship on SmackDown. Wes Lee is the current champion in his first reign. He defeated Carmelo Hayes, Oro Mensah, Nathan Frazer and Von Wagner in a five-man ladder match  on October 22, 2022 in Orlando, FL at Halloween Havoc.

The inaugural champion was Adam Cole. Velveteen Dream has the longest reign as champion at 231 days (209 days as recognized by WWE due to tape delay, but still the longest), Carmelo Hayes has the longest combined reign at 274 days. Johnny Gargano has the most reigns at three, with his first reign being the shortest at 4 days (due to tape delay, however, WWE recognizes that Gargano's first reign lasted 25 days, thus recognizing Solo Sikoa's reign as the shortest at 7 days). Dream is the youngest champion at 23 years old while Damian Priest is the oldest at 37.

Title history

Combined reigns 

References

External links 
Official NXT North American Championship title history

WWE NXT championships
WWE championships lists